Warsaw Scientific Society (Polish: Towarzystwo Naukowe Warszawskie; TNW) is a Polish scientific society based in Warsaw. It was established in 1907 as a continuation of the Society of Friends of Science to advance the sciences and arts and to publish scientific papers.

External links
 Warsaw Scientific Society homepage

Scientific societies based in Poland
Scientific organizations established in 1907
1907 establishments in Poland